Rhinorhipus is a genus of beetles that contains a single species, Rhinorhipus tamborinensis from southern Queensland, Australia. It is the sole member of the family Rhinorhipidae and superfamily Rhinorhipoidea. It is an isolated lineage not closely related to any other living beetle, estimated to have split from other beetles at least 200 million years ago, with studies either considering them the earliest diverging member of Elateriformia, or a basal lineage within Polyphaga. They exhibit feigning death (thanatosis) when disturbed. Their ecology is poorly known. It is likely that they are fossorial based on their morphology.

References 

Monotypic Elateriformia genera